The 2011–12 Polish Cup was the fifty-eighth season of the annual Polish football knockout tournament. It began on 19 July 2011 with the first matches of the extra preliminary round and ended on 24 April 2012 with the final. The winners qualified for the second qualifying round of the 2012–13 UEFA Europa League.

Legia Warsaw were the defending champions, having won their record breaking 14th title in the previous season. They successfully defended this title, becoming the winner of the Polish Cup for the 15th time in history.

Extra preliminary round
The draw for this round was conducted at the headquarters of the Polish FA on 28 June 2011. Participating in this round were 16 regional cup winners and 36 teams from the 2010–11 II Liga. The matches were played between 19 and 21 July 2011.

! colspan="3" style="background:cornsilk;"|19 July 2011

|-
! colspan="3" style="background:cornsilk;"|21 July 2011

|}
Notes:
 Steinpol-Ilanka Rzepin withdrew from the competition.
 Czarni Żagań used ineligible players. The match ended in a 2–1 victory for Chrobry.
 Ruch Wysokie Mazowieckie withdrew from the competition.
 Polonia Nowy Tomyśl withdrew from the competition.
 GLKS Nadarzyn withdrew from the competition.

Preliminary round
The matches were played on 2 and 3 August 2011 with the exception of Gryf vs. Zawisza match which was postponed to 10 August. Ruch Zdzieszowice and Jarota Jarocin received a bye to the first round.

! colspan="3" style="background:cornsilk;"|2 August 2011

|-
! colspan="3" style="background:cornsilk;"|3 August 2011

|-
! colspan="3" style="background:cornsilk;"|10 August 2011

|}

Round 1
The draw for this round was conducted at the headquarters of the Polish FA on 4 August 2011. The 14 winners of the preliminary round, along with Jarota Jarocin and Ruch Zdzieszowice and the eighteen teams from 2010–11 I Liga will compete in this round.

! colspan="3" style="background:cornsilk;"|16 August 2011

|-
! colspan="3" style="background:cornsilk;"|17 August 2011

|-
! colspan="3" style="background:cornsilk;"|23 August 2011

|-
! colspan="3" style="background:cornsilk;"|No match

|}
Notes:
 KSZO Ostrowiec Świętokrzyski withdrew from the competition.
 Odra Wodzisław Śląski and GKP Gorzów Wielkopolski went into liquidation before the start of the season.

Round 2
The draw for this round was made on 24 August 2011. The sixteen winners of the Round 1 and the sixteen teams from 2010–11 Ekstraklasa will compete in this round. The matches will be played between 20 and 28 September 2011.

! colspan="3" style="background:cornsilk;"|20 September 2011

|-
! colspan="3" style="background:cornsilk;"|21 September 2011

|-
! colspan="3" style="background:cornsilk;"|22 September 2011

|-
! colspan="3" style="background:cornsilk;"|27 September 2011

|-
! colspan="3" style="background:cornsilk;"|28 September 2011

|}

Notes:
 Due to renovation of the ŁKS stadium, the match took place in Chorzów, while ŁKS remained the host officially.

Round 3
The 16 winners from Round 2 compete in this round. The matches took place on October 18, 19, 25, 26 and November 9, 2011.

! colspan="3" style="background:cornsilk;"|18 October 2011

|-
! colspan="3" style="background:cornsilk;"|19 October 2011

|-
! colspan="3" style="background:cornsilk;"|25 October 2011

|-
! colspan="3" style="background:cornsilk;"|26 October 2011

|-
! colspan="3" style="background:cornsilk;"|9 November 2011

|}

Quarter-finals
The 8 winners from Round 3 will compete in this round.The matches were played in two legs. The first legs took place on 13 and 14 March 2012, while the second legs were played on 20 and 21 March 2012.

|}

First leg

Second leg

Semi-finals
The 4 winners from the Quarterfinals will compete in this round.The matches will be played in two legs. The first legs will take place on 3 and 4 April 2012, while the second legs will be played on 10 and 11 April 2012.The two winners will move on to this year's Final.

|}

First leg

Second leg

Final

See also
 2011–12 Ekstraklasa

References

 90minut.pl

Polish Cup
Cup
Polish Cup seasons